A pearl is a hard object produced by mollusks.

Pearl may also refer to:

People

People with the name
 Pearl (given name)
 Pearl (surname)
 Pearl Aday (born 1975), American singer-songwriter
 Granville Pearl Aikman (1858–1923), American judge
 Pearl Bailey, an American jazz musician
 Pearl Butler, an American country music singer

People with nickname or pseudonym
 Pearl (drag queen) (born 1990), stage name of drag performer and record producer Matthew James Lent
 Janis Joplin (1943–1970), American singer-songwriter, nicknamed Pearl
 Earl Monroe (born 1944), a.k.a. "Earl The Pearl", American basketball player

Places

In the United States
 Pearl, Colorado
 Pearl, Illinois
 Pearl, Kansas
 Pearl, Michigan
 Pearl, Mississippi
 Pearl, Missouri
 Pearl, United States Virgin Islands
 Pearl District, Portland, Oregon
 Pearl Harbor, Hawaii (nicknamed, "Pearl")
 The Pearl (Charlotte), a district in Charlotte, North Carolina

Elsewhere
 Pearl, Ontario, Canada
 Pearl Islands, Panama
 Pearl Rocks, Antarctica
 The Pearl-Qatar, an artificial island in Qatar

Arts, entertainment, and media

Awards
 P.E.A.R.L. Awards, an award for paranormal romantic literature
 Pearl Award, an award of the Faith-centered Music Association

Fictional entities
 Pearl (One Piece), a character in the One Piece manga 
 Pearl (Steven Universe), a character from the animated series Steven Universe
 Pearl, a flapjack octopus in the Finding Nemo franchise
 Pearl, a character from Disney's Home on the Range
 Granny Pearl, an elderly green sea turtle on Jim Henson's Pajanimals
 Pearl, a competitor on season 7 of RuPaul's Drag Race
 Pearl, a Little Mermaid character
 Pearl, the daughter of Hester Prynne in The Scarlet Letter by Nathaniel Hawthorne
 Pearl Fey, an Ace Attorney character
 Pearl Forrester, a Mystery Science Theater 3000 character
 Pearl Krabs, a SpongeBob SquarePants character
 Pearl the Observation Car, a Starlight Express character
 The Pearl, a fictional skyscraper in Skyscraper (2018 film)
 The Pearl (DHARMA Initiative), a research station on the TV series Lost
 Pearl and Marina, characters from the Splatoon franchise
 Pearl, a character from the Pokémon Adventures manga, named after Pokémon Pearl Version

Films
 The Pearl (film), a 1947 film adaptation of the Steinbeck novel
 Pearl (2016 film), an American short film directed by Patrick Osborne
 Pearl (2022 film), an American slasher film directed by Ti West

Literature
 Pearl (poem), a fourteenth-century Middle English work
 The Pearl (novel), by John Steinbeck

Music
 The Pearls, a musical group

Albums
 Pearl (Janis Joplin album)
 Pearls (Elkie Brooks album)
 Pearls (Ronnie Drew album)
 The Pearl (album), by Harold Budd and Brian Eno
 Pearls, a 1995 album by David Sanborn
Pearls, platinum selling album by BZN
 Pearl (Heather Nova album), 2019

Songs
 "Pearl", a song by Chapterhouse from their album Whirlpool
 "Pearl", a song by Katy Perry from her album Teenage Dream
 "Pearl", a song by Stevie Wonder from his album My Cherie Amour
 "Pearl", a song by Tommy Roe
 "The Pearl", a song by the American band Bright from the album The Miller Fantasies
 "The Pearl", a song by Emmylou Harris from her 2000 album Red Dirt Girl
 "The Pearl", a song by Fleming and John from their 1999 album The Way We Are and based on the Steinbeck novel
 "A Pearl", a song by Mitski from her 2018 album Be the Cowboy

Periodicals
 Pearl (literary magazine), a journal founded in 1974
 The Pearl (magazine), a pornographic publication published 1879–1880

Television
 Pearl (miniseries), a 1978 TV series about the attack on Pearl Harbor
 Pearl (TV series), a 1996–1997 sitcom
 "The Pearl", an episode of the cartoon She-Ra: Princess of Power
 TVB Pearl, a Hong Kong TV channel

Other uses in arts, entertainment, and media
 Pearl (cultural festival), the annual cultural festival of BITS Pilani Hyderabad Campus
 Pearl (radio play), by John Arden
 Pokémon Pearl, a video game

Brands and enterprises
 Pearl Art and Craft Supply
 Pearl Brewing Company
 Pearl Drums, a musical instrument manufacturer
 Pearl Group, an insurance service provider

Buildings
 Perlan (Icelandic for "Pearl"), a Reykjavík building
 The Pearl (Edmonton), a residential tower

Food and beverages
 Pearl (wine), a sparkling wine containing less than 1 bar of additional pressure
 Pearl, a barley (Hordeum vulgare) cultivar
 Pearl barley, barley processed to remove its hull and bran
 Pearl onion
 Tapioca pearls

Science and healthcare
 Pearl Index, a birth control research technique
 Polar Environment Atmospheric Research Laboratory, a laboratory at Eureka, Nunavut, Canada

Ships
 , the name of several Royal Navy ships
 , a cruise ship built in 1967, originally called the MS Finlandia, now the MS Golden Princess
 Norwegian Pearl, a Norwegian Cruise Lines cruise ship built in 2006
 X-Press Pearl, an X-Press Feeders containership that sank off Sri Lanka in 2021
 The Pearl, a schooner in the Pearl incident, a slave escape attempt
 , the name of more than one United States Navy ship

Technology
 PEARL (programming language)
 BlackBerry Pearl, a smartphone
 E Ink Pearl, an electronic paper technology
 Pearl, a printing press made by Golding & Company

Other uses 
 Pearl (color)
 Pearl (DART station)
 Pearl (typography), the type size between agate and diamond
 Pearl, an MGM Resorts International Mlife tier
 The Pearl, an 1867 U.S. Supreme Court case
 The Pearl (racehorse), 1871 winner of the Melbourne Cup
 Partnership for Enhancing Agriculture in Rwanda through Linkages
 People for Equality and Relief in Lanka (PEARL), a human rights group
 Purl stitch, a knitting stitch

See also
 Black Pearl (disambiguation)
 Paarl
 Pearl necklace (disambiguation)
 Pearl River (disambiguation)
 Perl (disambiguation)
 Purl (disambiguation)
 The White Pearl (disambiguation)